Westside Locos 13 or simply Westside Locos is a predominantly Latino-American street gang based in West Los Angeles with history dating back to the 1970s. They reside mainly in the Reynier Village neighborhood, and their main subset or "clique" is Halm Avenue Gangsters or "Halm Ave", which street name represents the center of the gang's territory. The gang is most known for their tagging.

Rivalry 

The gang's main rivals include the nearby 18th Street gang, Culver City 13, Sotel, Largo, Tortilla Flats, and Harpy.

Graffiti 

The gang's use of graffiti is evident with symbols like "WSLS", "LSX3", or simply "WS Locos", "LOKOS" is commonly used.

Allies 

The Westside Locos gang is part of a larger Locos 13 alliance gang located throughout Los Angeles County. This alliance includes the CV Locos of Compton, as well as the Westside Locos of Glendale. The gang also has a subset in  Simi Valley and San Diego. It historically had other street clicks in Los Angeles such as Bonsallo street, Wesley street, Fontana Locos 13 Mas Bagos, South Central, and other clicks they use to have everywhere in Los Angeles.

References 

Organizations established in the 1970s
1970s establishments in California
Sureños
Latino street gangs
Gangs in Los Angeles
Mexican-American culture in Los Angeles
Westside (Los Angeles County)